Mohamed Abdulla Farayare is a Somali professional football manager.

Career
In 2010 and 2013 he coached the Somalia national football team.

References

Year of birth missing (living people)
Living people
Somalian football managers
Somalia national football team managers
Place of birth missing (living people)